Euseius mesembrinus is a species of mite in the family Phytoseiidae.

References

mesembrinus
Articles created by Qbugbot
Animals described in 1957